Haifa Pride is an annual event which takes place in Haifa, Israel, in celebration of the LGBTQ community, was first hold in 2007. The main event is the Pride Parade which was attended by 3,000 people in 2016, including the city's mayor, Yona Yahav. The 3 kilometer long parade route culminates in Gan HaEm Park in Haifa's Merkaz HaCarmel neighborhood on Mount Carmel.

See also

 LGBT rights in Israel
 LGBT history in Israel
 Jerusalem gay pride parade
 Tel Aviv Pride

References 

Haifa
Pride parades in Israel
Annual events in Israel